Monazite-(Ce) is the most common representative of the monazite group. It is the cerium-dominant analogue of monazite-(La), monazite-(Nd), and monazite-(Sm). It is also the phosphorus analogue of gasparite-(Ce). The group contains simple rare earth phosphate minerals with the general formula of AXO4, where A = Ce, La, Nd, or Sm (or, rarely, Bi), and X = P or, rarely, As. The A site may also bear Ca and Th.

References

Cerium minerals
Lanthanide minerals
Phosphate minerals
Monoclinic minerals
Minerals in space group 14